Yvan Covent (12 October 1940 – 19 November 2011) was a Belgian cyclist. He competed in the team time trial at the 1960 Summer Olympics.

References

External links
 

1940 births
2011 deaths
Belgian male cyclists
Olympic cyclists of Belgium
Cyclists at the 1960 Summer Olympics
Cyclists from East Flanders
People from Nazareth, Belgium